The Fokker V.7 was a prototype German fighter triplane of World War I, an attempt to improve upon the Dr.I by using the experimental Siemens-Halske Sh.III, double acting rotary engine. (A double acting rotary involved the crankshaft rotating one way, with the crankcase turning the other). To make use of the higher power and rpm, the aircraft had a four-bladed propeller of larger diameter than the Dr.I. This required longer landing gear. The rear fuselage had to be extended to compensate for the heavier engine. Four V.7 aircraft were built. The V.7/I was in the fighter flyoff competition in January 1918. The performance of the V.7 was outstanding, but the engine was not ready for service. The Fokker V.7/I was converted to a Dr.I.

The V.7/II was powered by a  Gnome engine. The V.7/III used the  Goebel Goe.III, and while performance was excellent, the Goe.III was no more ready for combat than the Sh.III of the V.7/I.

The V.7/IV was supplied without an engine to the MAG firm of Austria-Hungary. MAG fitted it with a  Steyr rotary. The aircraft was intended to compete in the Austria-Hungarian fighter fly-off in July 1918, but damage due to a landing mishap caused it to miss the competition.

Bibliography

1910s German fighter aircraft
V.07
Rotary-engined aircraft
Single-engined tractor aircraft
Triplanes
Aircraft first flown in 1918